Al Jabin District is a district of the Raymah Governorate, Yemen. As of 2003, the district had a population of 71,777 inhabitants.

References

External links 

Districts of Raymah Governorate